The McKesson & Robbins, Inc. scandal of 1938 was one of the major financial scandals of the 20th century. The company McKesson & Robbins, Inc. (now McKesson Corporation) had been taken over in 1925 by Phillip Musica, who had previously used Adelphia Pharmaceutical Manufacturing Company as a front for bootlegging operations. Musica, a twice-convicted felon, used assumed names to conceal his true identity in taking control of the two companies: Frank D. Costa at Adelphia Pharmaceutical and F. Donald Coster at McKesson & Robbins. Although he was successful in expanding the company's legitimate business operations, Musica recruited three of his brothers, also working under assumed names, one outside the company and two inside it, to generate bogus sales documentation and to pay commissions to a shell distribution company under their control.  Eventually, McKesson & Robbins treasurer Julian Thompson discovered the distribution company was bogus. It was determined that about $20 million (about $335 million in 2017 dollars) of the $87 million in assets on the company's balance sheet were phony.

In December 1938, the Securities and Exchange Commission (SEC) opened an investigation and Musica was arrested. Only after he was booked, fingerprinted and released on bond did the authorities realize that "Coster" was in reality Musica. His bond was revoked and he committed suicide before he could be rearrested.

The McKesson & Robbins scandal led to major corporate governance and auditing reforms. The SEC required that public companies have audit committees of "outside" directors and that the appointment of auditors be approved by the shareholders. The American Institute of Accountants (now the American Institute of Certified Public Accountants) adopted audit standards requiring that auditors verify accounts receivable and inventory.

References
 Chatfield, Michael. "McKesson & Robbins Case." In History of Accounting: An International Encyclopedia, edited by Michael Chatfield and Richard Vangermeersch. New York: Garland Publishing, 1996. pp. 409–410. Full-text
John C. Coffee, Gatekeepers: The Professions and Corporate Governance Oxford: Oxford Univ. Press (2006)  pp. 139–140.
David Grayson Allen and Kathleen McDermott, Accounting for Success: A History of Price Waterhouse in America, 1890-1990 Boston: Harvard Business School Press (1993)  pp. 75–83.
Paul M. Clikeman, "The Greatest Frauds of the (Last) Century," monograph, May 2003, http://www.newaccountantusa.com/newsFeat/wealthManagement/Clikeman_Greatest_Frauds.pdf (accessed March 15, 2008).
Jerry W. Markham, A Financial History of Modern U.S. Corporate Scandals: From Enron to Reform Armonk, NY: M.E. Sharpe (2006) , p. 171.

Corporate scandals
1938 in the United States
Accounting scandals
Corruption in the United States